Rudolf Hesso of Baden-Baden (c. 1290 – 17 August 1335) was a son of Hesso, Margrave of Baden-Baden and his wife, Adelaide of Rieneck.  He succeeded his father as Margrave of Baden-Baden in 1297, and ruled jointly with his uncle, Rudolf III.  From 1332 to 1335, he ruled alone.

He married Joanna of Burgundy, Lady of Héricourt, a daughter of Reginald of Burgundy and widow of Count Ulrich II of Pfirt.

Rudolf Hesso and Joanna had two daughters:
 Margareta (d. 1367), married Frederick III, Margrave of Baden-Baden (d. 1353)
 Adelheid (d. after 1399), married in 1345 Rudolf V, Margrave of Baden-Pforzheim (d. 1361) and secondly Walram IV, Count of Tierstein (d. 1386).

Rudolph Hesso died in 1335.  As he had no male heirs, Baden-Baden was inherited after his death by his cousin, Rudolf IV, Margrave of Baden-Pforzheim.

House of Zähringen
Margraves of Baden
Year of birth unknown
1335 deaths
14th-century German nobility
Year of birth uncertain
1290 births